Cameraria perodeaui is a moth of the family Gracillariidae. It is found in the Democratic Republic of the Congo in primary rainforest.

The forewing ground colour is brownish ochreous with white markings while the hindwings are pale greyish. Adults are on wing in late May.

Etymology
The species is named in honour of Bruno Perodeau, the principal technical advisor and the director of the projects at the World Wildlife Foundation in the Democratic Republic of the Congo.

References

Moths described in 2012
perodeaui
Insects of the Democratic Republic of the Congo
Moths of Africa
Endemic fauna of the Democratic Republic of the Congo

Taxa named by Jurate de Prins